Black moccasin may refer to:

 Agkistrodon piscivorus, the cottonmouth, a venomous pitviper species found in the eastern United States
 Lampropeltis getula, the eastern kingsnake, a harmless colubrid species found in the eastern United States